Christmas List may refer to:
 Christmas list
 The Christmas List, a 1997 TV movie